Valerie Jean Dates is a historic date orchard and onetime popular U.S. Route 99 tourist stop located in Valerie, California, an unincorporated area a short distance south of Thermal.

Founded in 1928 by Russell Charles Nicoll and located on present-day Harrison Street at Avenue 66, the orchard is especially noteworthy as being the first to market dates directly to consumers. It was named in honor of his daughter Valerie Jean Nicoll. They are also responsible for being the first to market dates via mail order, for the creation of coconut- and almond-stuffed dates and for the creation of the date milkshake.

The business has been closed for some time, and as of at least 2009, all of the signs are gone and the building has fallen into poor condition.  The site was added to the roster of the California Office of Historic Preservation on February 11, 1991.

Pictures

See also
 Shields Date Gardens

References

 History and photos of Valerie Jean Dates at Ronslog.typepad.com
 Historic photo of dates being harvested at Valerie Jean from the Pomona Public Library
 Digital painting of Valerie Jean Dates c.1945 by Melvin Hale - ArtistLA/Pix2Canvas
 California OHP listing for Valerie Jean Dates
 Entry at Roadsidepeek.com
 History of US 99 through California at Bygonebyways.com
 
 

1928 establishments in California
Agriculture in Riverside County, California
Buildings and structures in Riverside County, California
Roadside attractions in California
Companies based in Riverside County, California
Date palm orchards